Coolabah is a small village in western New South Wales, Australia, 76 km north of Nyngan and 656 km north-west of Sydney. It lies on either side of the Mitchell Highway, with the area to the east of the highway in Brewarrina Shire and the westerly area in Bogan Shire.

History 
It took its name from Coolabah, a nearby property.

The railway, its prime reason for its existence, opened in 1884 and closed due to the Nyngan flood on 17 May 1989.

Gallery

References

Towns in New South Wales
Bogan Shire
Brewarrina Shire
Main Western railway line, New South Wales